Brock Strom (born September 21, 1934) is a former American football player, Air Force officer, and engineer. Rhodes scholar. 

Head of engineering for NAVSTAR GPS satellite program at USAF Space & Missile Systems Organization (SAMSO) precursor to Space Command and Space Force.

Biography
Strom was born in Munising, Michigan.

Strom was a member of the first graduating class of the United States Air Force Academy (USAFA) in 1959.  He was captain of the undefeated 1958 football team, and became the Academy's first All-American.  He gained the honor when players played offense and defense and just 11 were selected. Strom played tackle on the offensive and defensive lines.

He earned an M.S. from MIT in 1961, and a Ph.D. from Arizona State University in 1971.

He flew 90 missions as a navigator in Vietnam, and was decorated with two Distinguished Flying Crosses, two Bronze Stars, and three Air Medals.

As a lieutenant colonel, he became Director of Engineering in the GPS Joint Program Office.

After retiring from the Air Force as a colonel, he joined Burlington Northern Railroad as the director of the Advanced Railroad Electronics System (ARES), which used GPS for positive train control.  He became Vice President, Information Systems Services, Burlington Northern Railroad in April 1988.

References

External links
 

1934 births
Living people
American football tackles
Air Force Falcons football players
All-American college football players
College Football Hall of Fame inductees
People from Munising, Michigan
Players of American football from Michigan
Military personnel from Michigan